Thomas Matthew Mary Nangle (1889 – January 4, 1972) was a Newfoundland cleric, military chaplain of the Royal Newfoundland Regiment during World War I, diplomat and later a Rhodesian politician and farmer.

Early life
He was born in St. John's, Newfoundland and educated at St. Bonaventure College before attending All Hallows College seminary in Dublin and St. Patrick's, Carlow College in Ireland.

He was ordained in the Roman Catholic priesthood in 1913 at the Basilica of St. John the Baptist in St. John's, Newfoundland and enlisted in the Newfoundland Regiment in 1915 becoming the regiment's padre ultimately gaining the rank of lieutenant-colonel. While on furlough in 1917, he returned to St. John's, Newfoundland to deliver popular lectures about the experiences of the troops and calling for new recruits to join the war effort.

Public service career
Following the war, Nangle was appointed by the Dominion of Newfoundland's government as Director of War Graves, Registration, Enquiries and Memorials and also as the country's representative on the Imperial War Graves Commission in London and supervised the construction of memorials to Newfoundland soldiers in Newfoundland, including the National War Memorial in St. John’s at King’s Beach, and 15 war graveyards  and memorials in Europe and Gallipoli including the Beaumont-Hamel Newfoundland Memorial in Beaumont-Hamel in France and four other similar memorial parks at Gueudecourt, Masnières and Monchy-le-Preux in France and at Courtrai/Kortrijk Belgium on notable battlefields where the Newfoundland Regiment fought. While in London, he acted as the High Commissioner of Newfoundland to the United Kingdom from 1923 to 1924.

Rhodesia
In 1926, Nangle later left the priesthood, emigrated to Rhodesia in Africa where he became a farmer, married, and became active with the Reform Party, which he had helped found, and was elected in the 1933 election to the Southern Rhodesian Legislative Assembly as the MP for Salisbury District. He was defeated the next year in the 1934 election by Prime Minister of Southern Rhodesia Godfrey Martin Huggins who ran against Nangle in his district. Nangle ran for the legislative assembly again in the 1946 and 1948 elections as a candidate for the Rhodesia Labour Party but was defeated. He died in Rhodesia in 1972 at the age of 83.

Legacy
A street in St. John's is named Padre Nangle Place in his honour, and in 2016, Nangle was named a National Historic Person.

References

1889 births
1972 deaths
Rhodesian politicians
White Rhodesian people
Canadian emigrants to Rhodesia
Politicians from St. John's, Newfoundland and Labrador
Diplomats of former countries
World War I chaplains
Alumni of Carlow College
Alumni of All Hallows College, Dublin
Newfoundland military personnel of World War I
20th-century Canadian Roman Catholic priests
Rhodesian Roman Catholics
Persons of National Historic Significance (Canada)
Royal Newfoundland Regiment officers
Canadian military chaplains
Members of the Legislative Assembly of Southern Rhodesia